The 16th Infantry Division (Dutch: 16de Infanterie Divisie) was an Infantry Division of the Belgian Army that fought in the Battle of Belgium against the German Armed Forces.

World War II 
Source:

The 16th Infantry Division was mobilized in late 1939, becoming part of the General reserve of the Army. Since its forces were mostly raw conscripts, they were sent to Beverlo Camp for refitting. The 16th Infantry Division was partially modernized with WWI Weaponry like other divisions from the Second Reserve.

At the start of hostilities in May 1940, the 16th Infantry Division was stationed west of the front lines, at the Ghent Bridgehead, and behind the main line. On May 13, the 16th Infantry Division had to give up its Cyclist Units. Even more troubling for the 16th Infantry Division is that the Albert Canal had been breached and contact with German Forces was possible at this stage.

On May 16, an unexpected Allied abandonment of the K-W line forced the Belgian Forces to retreat as well. The airfields in the sector were destroyed although some were spared. The 16th Infantry Division would now be an active division.

The 16th Infantry Division will be under the Command of Iste Army Corps along with the 1st Division and the 18th Division. They were sent north, taking positions near Melle. All troops positioned at Melle are informed of German intentions (taking Melle) as the defenses were bolstered.

The attack came the following day, but the German attack seemed to ground to a halt, as they lack the strength to breakthrough. Minor skirmishes continue, but by May 22, the high command orders the front to fall back to Lye. Although they were reinforced by IV Corp with extra artillery support, desertion ran rapid. Even worse for the 16th division, the Germans have discovered that Bruggenhoofd Gent was abandoned and already established a breach in the new defenses.

Pressure is steadily increasing, especially after Allied Forces (including the Belgians) have been encircled in Flanders. The remaining Cyclist Units were dispatched along railway lines to Sint-Pieters possibly to halt the German forces. There was a lack of Infantry to follow up with halts in the German advance.

The 16th Infantry Division needed reorganization. Most of the Division was transferred to VII Corp. The 16th Division is place between Arsele, and will have the remains of some regiments of other divisions. Still, the Germans had the 16th Infantry Division routed. Tielt was taken and a huge breach was made by the Germans. The Germans had already amassed their forces and are planning for another strike. The 16th Infantry Division raced to construct another defense, struggling to maintain a connection between them and other divisions.

By May 28, orders were not called upon as communication became a huge problem. It became clear that the Battle of Belgium was lost as the remaining Belgian Divisions either gave up, or surrendered.

Structure 1940 
Structure of the division at the eve of the Battle of Belgium.

•Headquarters, at Ghent

•Commanding Officer, 16th Division -Lieutenant- General Georges Van Egroo

°37th Line Regiment

°41st Line Regiment

°44th Line Regiment

°24th Artillery Regiment

°18th Engineer Battalion

°16th Company of Transmission Troops

°Cyclist Group 16ID

See also 
 Army Group B

 Battle of Belgium

 11th Infantry Division

 18th Infantry Division 

 K-W line

References

Battle of Belgium
Infantry divisions of Belgium
Military units and formations of Belgium in World War II